Merrittville Speedway is a 3/8 mile dirt short track motor racing oval, located 20 minutes west of Niagara Falls, in Thorold, Ontario, Canada. The track hosts a weekly Saturday night program that runs from April to September each year and features stock car, sprint car and modified races.

History
The speedway is known as the oldest operating race track in Canada as it has been in continuous operation since it opened on July 1, 1952.

New ownership took over the track in 2017 and it celebrated its seventieth anniversary in 2021.

Speedway classes
The tracks weekly racing program features six classes of racing:
 358 Modifieds
 Sportsman
 Stocks
 4 Cylinders
 Modified Lites
 V6

The track has also regularly featured touring series including the Super DIRTcar Series, World of Outlaws Late Model Series, UMP Modifieds, DIRTcar Sportsman Series, Action Sprint Tour, Southern Ontario Sprints, Empire Super Sprints and the Patriot Sprint Tour.

The track also hosts a weekly karting series on Tuesday nights.

See also
List of dirt track ovals in Canada
Humberstone Speedway
Ohsweken Speedway

References

External links
Merrittville Speedway Official Site

Motorsport venues in Ontario
Dirt oval racing venues in Canada
Motorsport in Canada
1952 establishments in Ontario
Thorold
Tourist attractions in the Regional Municipality of Niagara